1 × 1 (One Times One, sometimes stylized I × I) is a 1944 book of poetry by American poet E. E. Cummings. Cummings's biographer Richard S. Kennedy described the theme of the book, Cummings's ninth, as "oneness and the means (one times one) whereby that oneness is achieved—love". The book contains 54 poems, including portraits of people important to Cummings, and antiwar poems. It received the Shelley Memorial Award in 1945, and was reissued by publisher Harcourt Brace in 1954.

See also
 pity this busy monster, manunkind
 Quotes from 1 × 1 at Wikiquote

References

1944 poetry books
Poetry by E. E. Cummings
American poetry collections
Henry Holt and Company books